Mount Cooper is a 6780-foot (2067-meter) mountain summit located in the Fairweather Range of the Saint Elias Mountains, in southeast Alaska. Although modest in elevation, relief is significant since the mountain rises up from tidewater in less than two miles. Mount Cooper can be seen from Johns Hopkins Inlet which is a popular destination for cruise ships. The mountain's name was proposed in the 1950s for William Skinner Cooper (1884-1978), a plant ecologist who performed vegetation-glacier relationship studies in the Glacier Bay area, and was chairman of the committee of scientists which proposed establishing Glacier Bay National Monument. The mountain's name was officially adopted in 1980 by the United States Geological Survey following Cooper's death. The months May through June offer the most favorable weather for climbing Mount Cooper.

Climate

Based on the Köppen climate classification, Mount Cooper has a subarctic climate with cold, snowy winters, and mild summers. Temperatures can drop below −20 °C with wind chill factors below −30 °C. This climate supports small hanging glaciers on its slopes as well as the larger Kashoto Glacier to the west and Lamplugh Glacier to the east. Precipitation runoff and meltwater from its glaciers drains into Johns Hopkins Inlet.

See also

List of mountain peaks of Alaska
Geography of Alaska

References

Gallery

External links
 Weather forecast: Mount Cooper

Cooper
Cooper
Cooper
Cooper
Cooper